The 2021 ATP Lyon Open (also known as the Open Parc Auvergne-Rhône-Alpes Lyon) was a men's tennis tournament played on outdoor clay courts. It was the fourth edition of the Lyon Open and part of the ATP Tour 250 series of the 2021 ATP Tour. It took place in the city of Lyon, France, from 15 May through 22 May 2021.

Champions

Singles

  Stefanos Tsitsipas def.  Cameron Norrie, 6–3, 6–3

Doubles

  Hugo Nys /  Tim Pütz def.  Pierre-Hugues Herbert /  Nicolas Mahut, 6–4, 5–7, [10–8]

Points and prize money

Point distribution

Prize money 

*per team

Singles main draw entrants

Seeds 

 Rankings are as of May 10, 2021.

Other entrants 
The following players received wildcards into the singles main draw:
  Benjamin Bonzi
  Dominic Thiem
  Stefanos Tsitsipas

The following player received entry as an alternate:
  Lorenzo Musetti

The following players received entry from the qualifying draw:
  Grégoire Barrère
  Kamil Majchrzak
  João Sousa
  Mikael Ymer

The following players received entry as lucky losers:
  Arthur Rinderknech
  Thiago Seyboth Wild

Withdrawals 
Before the tournament
  Matteo Berrettini → replaced by  Corentin Moutet
  Jérémy Chardy → replaced by  Yoshihito Nishioka
  Dan Evans → replaced by  Pierre-Hugues Herbert
  Taylor Fritz → replaced by  Cameron Norrie
  Lloyd Harris → replaced by  Thiago Seyboth Wild
  John Millman → replaced by  Gilles Simon
  Albert Ramos Viñolas → replaced by  Arthur Rinderknech
  Lorenzo Sonego → replaced by  Lorenzo Musetti

Doubles main draw entrants

Seeds

 Rankings are as of May 10, 2021.

Other entrants
The following pairs received wildcards into the doubles main draw:
  Grégoire Barrère /  Albano Olivetti
  Petros Tsitsipas /  Stefanos Tsitsipas
The following pair enters with a protected ranking into the doubles main draw:
  Marc López /  Fabrice Martin

Withdrawals 
Before the tournament
  Jérémy Chardy /  Fabrice Martin → replaced by  Marc López /  Fabrice Martin
  Marcus Daniell /  Philipp Oswald → replaced by  André Göransson /  Andrei Vasilevski
  Jonathan Erlich /  Lloyd Harris → replaced by  Artem Sitak /  João Sousa
  John Millman /  Divij Sharan → replaced by  Sander Arends /  Divij Sharan
  Aisam-ul-Haq Qureshi /  Andrea Vavassori → replaced by  Aleksandr Nedovyesov /  Andrea Vavassori

References

External links 
 Official website

2021
2021 ATP Tour
2021 in French tennis
May 2021 sports events in France